2-Bromoethyl ether (or Bis(2-bromoethyl) ether) is an organobromine compound that is also an ether. It is used in the manufacture of pharmaceuticals and crown ethers.

References

Ethers
Organobromides